Bester is a surname and may refer to:

People:
 Alfred Bester (1913–1987), American science fiction author
 Allan Bester (born 1964), Canadian retired professional ice hockey goaltender
 John Bester (1927–2010), English translator of modern Japanese non-fiction
 Junior Bester (born 1987), South African rugby union player
 Madge Bester (born 1963), South African believed to be the world's shortest living woman
 Marinus Bester (born 1969), German football player
 Philip Bester (born 1988), Canadian tennis player
 Rolly Bester (1917–1984), American actress and advertising executive, wife of Alfred Bester
 Rudolf Bester (born 1983), Namibian football player
 Ryan Bester (born 1984), Canadian lawn bowler
 Willie Bester (born 1956), South African artist

Fictional characters
 Alfred Bester (Babylon 5)

See also
 Bestor, a similar surname
 Bester, a minor character from Firefly